Dave Steckel is an American football coach and former player. He was recently the head coach at Missouri State University. Prior to that, he spent 14 seasons on the staff at the University of Missouri. His other coaching stops include Miami University of Ohio, Ball State University, the University of Minnesota, Dickinson College, Lehigh University, the University of Toledo, and Rutgers University.

Coaching career
Steckel's coaching career started shortly after his playing career ended at Kutztown in 1982. He got his start as a graduate assistant at Miami (OH).

In 1984, he joined the Ball State staff as the defensive line coach.

Steckel spent the 1985 season as a graduate assistant at Minnesota.

From 1986 to 1987, Steckel was the associate head coach and offensive coordinator at Dickinson College.

From Dickinson, Steckel moved on to Lehigh, where he served as the special teams coordinator and linebackers coach from 1988 to 1991.

In 1992, Steckel joined Gary Pinkel’s staff at Toledo coaching the defensive line. He held that position through the 1995 season.

Steckel then joined the coaching staff at Rutgers for five seasons. He coached the defensive line from 1996 to 1998 and the linebackers in 1999 and 2000.

In 2001, Steckel reunited with Gary Pinkel at Missouri, joining the Tigers as the linebackers coach. Steckel would spend the next 14 years tutoring the Tigers linebackers, was promoted to defensive coordinator prior to the 2009 season, and was promoted to associate head coach prior to the 2011 season.
 
On December 14, 2014, Steckel was named the 20th head football coach at Missouri State.

On January 10, 2020, Steckel was bought out of his contract with Missouri State.

Steckle was officially hired by the St. Louis BattleHawks on September 13, 2022. He left the Team on March 2, 2023.

Playing career
Steckel played four seasons as an offensive lineman at Kutztown University.

Personal life
A native of Fullerton, Pennsylvania, Steckel enlisted in the United States Marine Corps following his high school graduation, and served from 1975 to 1978. He is the younger brother of former NFL coach, Les Steckel.

Steckel and his wife, Mary Beth, have one daughter, Amanda.

Head coaching record

College

References

External links
 Missouri State profile

Year of birth missing (living people)
Living people
American football offensive linemen
Ball State Cardinals football coaches
Dickinson Red Devils football coaches
Lehigh Mountain Hawks football coaches
Kutztown Golden Bears football players
Miami RedHawks football coaches
Minnesota Golden Gophers football coaches
Missouri Tigers football coaches
Missouri State Bears football coaches
Rutgers Scarlet Knights football coaches
Toledo Rockets football coaches
United States Marines